Serrheum or Serreion was a town on the island of Samothrace mentioned by Stephanus of Byzantium.

References

Samothrace
Populated places in the ancient Aegean islands
Lost ancient cities and towns